Finau Ohuafi (born 25 January 2001) is a Tongan swimmer. He represented Tonga at the 2019 World Aquatics Championships in Gwangju, South Korea. He competed in the men's 50 metre freestyle and men's 100 metre freestyle events. He also competed in two relay events.

In 2017, he competed in short course swimming at the Asian Indoor and Martial Arts Games held in Ashgabat, Turkmenistan.

In 2018, he represented Tonga at the 2018 Commonwealth Games held in Gold Coast, Australia. He competed in the men's 50 metre backstroke, men's 50 metre butterfly and men's 50 metre freestyle events. In the same year, he also competed in several events at the 2018 FINA World Swimming Championships (25 m) in Hangzhou, China.

He represented Tonga at the 2022 Commonwealth Games held in Birmingham, England.

References

External links

Living people
2001 births
Place of birth missing (living people)
Tongan male swimmers
Male backstroke swimmers
Male butterfly swimmers
Tongan male freestyle swimmers
Swimmers at the 2018 Summer Youth Olympics
Swimmers at the 2018 Commonwealth Games
Swimmers at the 2022 Commonwealth Games
Commonwealth Games competitors for Tonga
21st-century Tongan people